A list of windmills in the Dutch province of North Holland.

References

 
North Holland